Francisco Castillo Nájera (25 November 1886 in Victoria de Durango – 20 December 1954 in Mexico City) was a Mexican diplomat and politician. He was president of the Assembly of the League of Nations from 1934 to 1935, ambassador to China and the United States, also as the dean of the diplomatic corps in 1945, the last year of his tenure, and Secretary of Foreign Affairs from 1945 to 1946.

References

External links
League of Nations Photo Archive: Mexican Delegation

Presidents of the Assembly of the League of Nations
Mexican Secretaries of Foreign Affairs
Ambassadors of Mexico to the United States
Deans of the Diplomatic Corps to the United States
Ambassadors of Mexico to the Netherlands
Ambassadors of Mexico to France
Ambassadors of Mexico to Japan
Ambassadors of Mexico to China
Ambassadors of Mexico to Austria
Permanent Representatives of Mexico to the United Nations
Politicians from Durango
People from Durango City
1886 births
1954 deaths